Gabriel Ovidio Curuchet (born 24 June 1963) is a retired road bicycle racer and track cyclist from Argentina, who represented his native country at four Summer Olympics (1984, 1988, 1996 and 2000). He won the gold medal in the Men's 4.000m Individual Pursuit at the 1987 Pan American Games, followed by the gold in the Men's Madison in 1999 with his brother Juan Curuchet. He was a professional rider from 1989 to 2005.

References

External links
 

1963 births
Living people
Argentine people of French descent
Argentine track cyclists
Argentine male cyclists
Cyclists from Buenos Aires
Cyclists at the 1983 Pan American Games
Cyclists at the 1987 Pan American Games
Cyclists at the 1984 Summer Olympics
Cyclists at the 1988 Summer Olympics
Cyclists at the 1996 Summer Olympics
Cyclists at the 1999 Pan American Games
Cyclists at the 2000 Summer Olympics
Olympic cyclists of Argentina
Pan American Games gold medalists for Argentina
Pan American Games bronze medalists for Argentina
Pan American Games medalists in cycling
Medalists at the 1983 Pan American Games
Medalists at the 1987 Pan American Games